Regentville is a suburb of Sydney, in the state of New South Wales, Australia. It is 56 kilometres west of the Sydney central business district, in the local government area of the City of Penrith, and is part of the Greater Western Sydney region. It is located on the eastern bank of the Nepean River, just south of Jamisontown.

History

European settlement
Following the arrival of the First Fleet land was granted to British settlers by the colonial administration. The first land grant in this area was to the Irish-born Surgeon-General of New South Wales, Thomas Jamison, who had arrived in 1788 aboard the Sirius. After Thomas' death in London in 1811, the land (at what is now Jamisontown) was taken up by his son, John, also a surgeon, who had served under Admiral Horatio Nelson at the Battle of Trafalgar, and was knighted for his medical services to the Royal Navy by the prince regent of the United Kingdom, later King George IV, in 1813.

Sir John Jamison arrived in Sydney in 1814 and progressively established himself during the ensuing two decades as one of the colony's biggest and wealthiest land owners. In 1823–24, he built a magnificent Georgian-style, sandstone mansion on a rise overlooking the Nepean River. He named the mansion Regentville House in honour of the Prince Regent. Sir John held so many lavish balls, banquets and other social activities at the mansion that he became known as the "hospitable knight of Regentville". He later erected a multi-storey tweed mill on his extensive estate and established a dairy, a thoroughbred horse stud, ornamental gardens, a cemetery, and a school for the children of his work force. Other parts of the estate were given over to an orchard, a terraced vineyard, and grazing paddocks for sheep and cattle.

Sir John died at Regentville House in 1844, aged 68, having lost much of his fortune in a severe economic downturn then afflicting the colony. He is buried in St Stephen's churchyard, Penrith. The Regentville estate passed to his children but the land was gradually sold off in chunks, following an acrimonious inheritance dispute. Regentville House was later turned into an asylum and then leased out as a hotel. Sadly, however, it burned down in suspicious circumstances in 1868. Today, only the house's cellars and drains survive, along with some meagre sections of its masonry walls. Sir John's tweed mill has disappeared, too, but the overgrown terracing of the estate's vineyard can still be discerned.

The area around the site of Regentville House has remained largely rural, if hemmed in somewhat by the modern residential suburbs of Jamisontown and Glenmore Park. It has been the subject of archaeological excavations undertaken by the University of Sydney and images of the house are extant in various public and private collections.

Regentville Post Office opened on 1 October 1953 and closed in 1979.

Heritage listings 
Regentville has a number of heritage-listed sites, including:
 427 Mulgoa Road: Glenleigh Estate

Transport
Mulgoa Road is the main road in the suburb, connecting with both Penrith and the M4 Motorway which in turn provides quick connection to greater Sydney and the Blue Mountains. The nearest railway station is at Penrith on the Western Line of the Sydney Trains network. Busways provides three bus services in the area with the 799 connecting the majority of Regentville with both Glenmore Park and Penrith, while Route 797 and Route 795 travels along Mulgoa Road towards Glenmore Park and Warragamba/Wallacia respectively.

Education

The only school in the suburb is Regentville Public School. The nearest high school is located in Glenmore Park.

Population

Demographics 
The recorded population of Regentville in the 2006 census was just 714. The majority of residents are Australian born (81%) with small minorities born in England (4%) and Malta (2%). The most common religious affiliation is Anglican (34%), almost double the national average, followed by Catholic (32%), those with no religion (9.2%), Presbyterian (3.8%) and Jehovah's Witnesses (2.2%). The median income ($535 per week) was slightly higher than the national average ($466).

Governance
At a local government level, Regentville is part of the south ward of Penrith City Council, represented by Jim Aitken, Mark Davies, Karen McKeown, Susan Page and Gary Rumble. The current mayor is Jim Aitken. At the state governmental level, it is part of the Electoral district of Mulgoa, represented by Labor's Diane Beamer. Federally, it is part of the Division of Lindsay, represented by Liberal Party Melissa McIntosh.

Regentville Rural Fire Brigade
Regentville Rural Fire Brigade is one of many Volunteer Fire Brigades located in New South Wales. The Brigade is a part of the NSW Rural Fire Service and was established in 1951. It currently has approximately 60 operationally active members. The brigade has 2 Category 1 tankers, 1 Category 11 Pumper, a Boat and a Personal Carrier.

References

External links
 Penrith Local Suburb Profiles

Suburbs of Sydney